Bugaboo Provincial Park is a provincial park in British Columbia, Canada, located in the central Purcell Mountains.

It was established in 1995 as an amalgamation of Bugaboo Glacier Park, Bugaboo Alpine Recreation Area, and various adjacent lands. The park is known primarily for the Bugaboos, a formation of mountains that attracts climbers and mountaineers, and for the Conrad Kain hut, an alpine hut managed by the Alpine Club of Canada.

References

External links

Provincial parks of British Columbia
Columbia Valley
Purcell Mountains
1995 establishments in British Columbia
Protected areas established in 1995
Buildings and structures in British Columbia